Dragomir Nikolić was a Serbian football manager. He was joint head coach of the Yugoslavia national football team together with Aleksandar Tirnanić and Ljubomir Lovrić from 1959 to 1961.

External links

Yugoslav football managers
Serbian football managers
1960 European Nations' Cup managers
Possibly living people